Andrew Main Alfred Percy was a Scottish professional footballer who played as an outside left in the Scottish League for Leith Athletic, East Stirlingshire and Montrose. He also played in the Football League for Clapton Orient.

Career statistics

References 

English Football League players
Barrow A.F.C. players
Clapton Orient F.C. wartime guest players
Scottish footballers
1912 births
Year of death missing
Association football outside forwards
People from Newmains
Lesmahagow F.C. players
Leith Athletic F.C. players
East Stirlingshire F.C. players
Scottish Football League players
Montrose F.C. players
Cork City F.C. (1938–1940) players
Ilford F.C. players
Leyton Orient F.C. players
Plymouth Argyle F.C. players
Sportspeople from Wishaw
Footballers from North Lanarkshire